This Man Must Die, American title The Beast Must Die, is a 1969 French and Italian psychological thriller film directed by Claude Chabrol. The story is based on the 1938  novel The Beast Must Die by Cecil Day-Lewis, writing as Nicholas Blake. A widower, obsessed with revenge after his only son is killed in a hit-and-run incident, tracks down and seduces the driver's mistress who was in the car at the time but his efforts to kill the driver misfire.

The film had a total of 1,092,910 admissions in France.

Plot

A sports car races through the countryside. A young woman is in the passenger seat. It enters a small village at high speed. It hits Charles Thénier's young son, who is returning from the beach, and drives on without stopping. Charles vows to have his revenge, keeping a journal of his thoughts.

The police investigation is fruitless. Charles thinks the guilty party may run a garage, since there is no record of a car going in for repairs. By chance, while pursuing this hunch, he discovers that the actress Hélène Lanson was the passenger in a car that was damaged on the day of his son's death. Adopting a pseudonym, he seduces her and discovers that the driver was her brother-in-law Paul Decourt. He arranges a trip with Hélène to visit her sister's family in Brittany.

Charles discovers that Paul is detestable, cruel to his wife and hated by his teenage son Philippe. He has conflicting thoughts as to whether or not he will kill Paul but rescues him from a cliff-fall. Philippe confides to Charles his own desire to kill his father.

Hélène confesses that she once slept with Paul so Charles presses her to explain more of her anxiety about Paul but she refuses to add anything.

Charles decides to kill Paul in a staged sailing accident and buys a boat for that purpose. However, while at sea, Paul pulls a gun on him and reveals that he has read Charles's journal and passed it to his solicitor to take to the police should something happen to him. After returning to the harbour, Paul throws Charles out of his house.

Charles appears to abandon his plan to murder Paul and drives away with Hélène. In a roadside restaurant, a television announcer reports Paul's death from poisoning and appeals for Charles and Hélène to return, which they do. Charles argues with the police that it would be foolhardy for him to kill Paul when he knew the journal would reach them. They contend that Charles has planned to use this argument to deflect their suspicions, and arrest him. However, Philippe enters and confesses to the murder.

Back at their hotel, Charles is weary and promises to tell Hélène the entire story the next day. She wakes to find his note explaining that Philippe has confessed falsely to the crime Charles himself committed. He tells her to share his confession with the police and that he will punish himself and never be seen again. He is seen sailing oceanward.

The Brahms piece "Denn es gehet dem Menschen wie dem Vieh" ('For that which befalleth the sons of men befalleth beasts', OT Koh 3,19-22 LUT) from Four Serious Songs op. 121, is sung by Kathleen Ferrier as a motif.

Selected cast
Michel Duchaussoy as Charles Thénier
Caroline Cellier as Hélène Lanson
Jean Yanne as Paul Decourt
Anouk Ferjac as Jeanne Decourt
 Marc Di Napoli as Philippe Decourt
 Louise Chevalier as Madame Levenes
Dominique Zardi as Police Inspector
Maurice Pialat as Police Commissioner

References

External links
PLFLY
 

1969 films
Films based on British novels
French psychological thriller films
1960s French-language films
Italian psychological thriller films
1960s psychological thriller films
Films directed by Claude Chabrol
Films with screenplays by Paul Gégauff
Films set in Brittany
1960s Italian films
1960s French films